Yost & Packard was an architectural firm based in Columbus, Ohio, United States. The firm included partners Joseph W. Yost and Frank Packard. It was founded in 1892 and continued until Yost moved to New York City in 1899, after which Packard took up practice in his own name.

The firm was known for many public buildings, and the prolific use of masonry, especially Berea sandstone, along with tile roofs with flared eaves, polygonal turrets, and intricate ornamentation. Their works resemble elements of Richardsonian Romanesque architecture blended with the creative Victorian works of Frank Furness.

Selected works

Notable works by Yost & Packard include:

In Columbus

Additionally, the Charles Frederick Myers house in Columbus is suspected to be a Yost & Packard work.

Outside Columbus

Additionally, the firm designed the First Presbyterian Church, Urbana High School, the Pennsylvania Railroad Depot, and a barn for Frank Chance at 438 Scioto Street, and the house of Mrs. M.J. Laudenbach (524 Scioto Street), all in Urbana, Ohio. In St. Marys, Ohio, the firm designed the Grand Opera House (105-113 W. Spring St., 1895, extant) and the Gustave Bamberger residence (225 South Wayne Street, built 1895, extant).

See also
 Architecture of Columbus, Ohio

References

External links
 

Defunct architecture firms based in Ohio
Architects from Columbus, Ohio
20th-century American architects
19th-century American architects